Jowers is a surname. Notable people with the surname include:

Christine Jowers, American dancer, teacher, producer and dance critic
James Jowers (1939–2009), American street photographer
Loyd Jowers (1926–2000), American restaurateur
Milton Jowers (1914–1972), American football and basketball coach and college athletics administrator